The Honda Classic is a professional golf tournament on the PGA Tour in south Florida. It was founded in 1972 as Jackie Gleason's Inverrary Classic, and prior to a schedule change in 2021 was frequently the first of the Florida events in late winter following the "West Coast Swing."

National Airlines was the sponsor in 1973 with Gleason, and American Motors Corporation (AMC) backed it in 1981. Since 1982, American Honda Motor Company (Honda) was the title sponsor. Honda announced the 2023 tournament was its final as title sponsor. A new title sponsor for 2024 has not yet been announced.

Tournament history
The tournament's predecessor, the National Airlines Open Invitational, ran for just three seasons from 1969 to 1971), all in late March at the Country Club of Miami in Hialeah. The Gleason tournament replaced it on the schedule a month earlier in 1972 at the Inverrary Country Club (East course) in Lauderhill, and was among the richest events on tour with an inaugural purse of $260,000 and a $52,000 winner's share. 

The regular event was not played in 1976, as Inverrary hosted the Tournament Players Championship in late February, won by Jack Nicklaus. Gleason's nine-year affiliation ended after 1980. 

The 1981 event was renamed "American Motors Inverrary Classic" as it was sponsored by American Motors Corporation, then the following two years it was known as the "Honda Inverrary Classic" after a switch in sponsor to Honda. In 1984 the tournament moved to TPC Eagle Trace in Coral Springs, where it remained until 1991.

From 1992 to 1995, the event was held at the Weston Hills Golf & Country Club in Weston. It then returned to Coral Springs, first at the TPC at Eagle Trace in 1996 and then at the TPC at Heron Bay from 1997 to 2002. In 2003, the event moved to Palm Beach Gardens, first at the Country Club at Mirasol through 2006, then to the Champion Course at PGA National Resort and Spa in 2007.

Since 2007, the tournament's main beneficiary is the Nicklaus Children's Health Care Foundation, chaired by Barbara Nicklaus, wife of hall of fame golfer Jack Nicklaus.

IMG bought the tournament's management company in 2013.

Player participation
Some celebrated players have won this tournament, including Nicklaus in 1977 and 1978, the only consecutive winner in its history. However, the tournament had acquired a reputation for struggling to attract the top players as it moved from course to course in South Florida. Since 2007, The Honda Classic has seen a vastly improved player field, largely due to the decision to make PGA National the tournament's permanent home.

The prize money is comparable to other regular PGA Tour events. The original winner's share of $52,000 in 1972 made it one of the richest stops on tour, greater than for any of the four majors; it was more than double that of the Masters, which had a first prize of $25,000

Tournament highlights
 1972: Tom Weiskopf outdueled Jack Nicklaus by one shot to win the first edition.
 1974: Leonard Thompson earned the first of his three PGA Tour wins, one shot ahead of Hale Irwin. After his victory, Thompson donated $10,000 of his winnings to the Boys Clubs of America.
 1978: Jack Nicklaus birdies the last five holes to defeat Grier Jones by one shot, for his third consecutive win at Inverrary.
 1980: Johnny Miller records his first tour win since the 1976 Open Championship, finishing two shots ahead of Bruce Lietzke and Charles Coody.
 1981: Curtis Strange had a four-shot lead before the final into the final round. In the end, Tom Kite won and avoided a playoff because Jack Nicklaus missed a 3-footer for par.
 1986: Monday qualifier Kenny Knox wins by one-shot over Clarence Rose, Jodie Mudd, Andy Bean, and John Mahaffey in spite of shooting a third round 80.
 1987: Mark Calcavecchia wins his first Honda Classic title. Only the year before he worked as a caddy at the tournament.
 1990: John Huston wears three different pairs of shoes in practice and during the tournament after the PGA declared his wedge-soled Weight-Rites illegal.
 1991: Steve Pate shoots the worst last-round score by a PGA Tour tournament winner in ten years, a 75, but still holds on to win by three shots over Paul Azinger and Dan Halldorson.
 1992: Corey Pavin defeats Fred Couples in a sudden-death playoff only after holing a 136-yard 8-iron shot for eagle on the 72nd hole to tie for the lead.
 1996: Tim Herron becomes the first PGA Tour rookie in 13 years to win a tournament wire-to-wire. He defeats Mark McCumber by four shots.
 2000: Dudley Hart birdies the last four holes to defeat J. P. Hayes and Kevin Wentworth by one shot.
 2004: Thirty-eight-year-old PGA Tour rookie Todd Hamilton wins by one shot over Davis Love III. Hamilton would go on to win The Open Championship later that same year.
 2007: Mark Wilson wins the biggest playoff in the history of the tournament. His birdie on the third hole of sudden death defeats José Cóceres. Camilo Villegas and Boo Weekley, the other participants in the four-man playoff, had been eliminated on the second playoff hole.
2012: Rory McIlroy wins and claims the No. 1 spot in the Official World Golf Ranking. Brian Harman shot a course record 61 in the second round.
2022: Sepp Straka becomes the first Austrian to win on the PGA Tour.

Tournament hosts

No event in 1976, Inverrary hosted the Tournament Players Championship.

Winners

Note: Green highlight indicates scoring records.
Sources:

Multiple winners
Four men have won the tournament more than once.
2 wins
Jack Nicklaus: 1977, 1978
Johnny Miller: 1980, 1983
Mark Calcavecchia: 1987, 1998
Pádraig Harrington: 2005, 2015

Notes

References

External links

Coverage on the PGA Tour's official site
PGA National Resort & Spa – Champion course

PGA Tour events
Golf in Florida
Sports competitions in Florida
Sports in Palm Beach County, Florida
Recurring sporting events established in 1972
1972 establishments in Florida